The 1998 season was the Denver Broncos' 29th in the National Football League (NFL) and their 39th overall. The Broncos entered the season as the defending Super Bowl champions and looked to become only the fifth team in league history to win consecutive Super Bowls.
 
Finishing with a record of 12–4 the previous year, the Broncos improved on that mark by two wins and tied the Atlanta Falcons for second best record at 14–2. They won their first thirteen games, the best start since the unbeaten 1972 Dolphins.

After 16 seasons, John Elway retired following the Super Bowl. He finished his Broncos career with 51,475 yards passing and 300 touchdowns. Until Peyton Manning won in Super Bowl 50, Elway stood as the only Broncos quarterback to win a Super Bowl. However, Elway even played a large role in that victory as the general manager and president of football operations for the Broncos.

Running back Terrell Davis set a team single season rushing mark. His final total was 2,008 yards, making him only the fourth player to rush for over 2,000 yards in single season.

A multi-year investigation from 2001 to 2005 revealed that between 1996 and 1998, the team had cheated the salary cap by deferring other money to Elway and Davis outside of the team’s salary. At the time of the incidents, Denver believed it gave them no competitive advantage. The team was fined nearly two million dollars and were forced to give up two third-round picks in the 2002 and 2005 drafts.

In 2007, the 1998 Broncos were ranked as the 12th greatest Super Bowl champions on the NFL Network's documentary series America's Game: The Super Bowl Champions. They ranked #14 on the 100 greatest teams of all time presented by the NFL on its 100th anniversary.

Offseason

NFL draft

Staff

Roster

Season summary

The Broncos won their first 13 games of the season. There was much speculation that they might finish 19–0 and the Broncos were featured on the cover of Sports Illustrated. However, they were upset by the New York Giants (who would end another attempt at a 19–0 season nine seasons later) in week 15 by a score of 20–16. They finished the regular season 14–2 after losing to the Dolphins in their first encounter with that team since 1985.

They finished first in the AFC West and won their divisional playoff game against the Miami Dolphins 38–3 for their first win over the Dolphins since 1968. They then won the AFC Championship over the Bill Parcells coached New York Jets 23–10 after coming back from a 10–0 deficit. Many had expected Denver to play the Minnesota Vikings, the team with the number one record that year at 15–1, in the Super Bowl. However, the Vikings lost the NFC Championship Game to the Atlanta Falcons in overtime.

The Broncos defeated the Falcons 34–19 in Super Bowl XXXIII. Elway was the Super Bowl MVP and Davis rushed for over 100 yards. It was Elway's last game, and Denver would not reach the Super Bowl again until the 2013 season.

Preseason

Regular season

Schedule

Standings

Playoffs

AFC Divisional Game vs. Miami Dolphins

AFC Championship Game vs. New York Jets

Despite a subpar performance from quarterback John Elway, the Broncos came from a ten-point deficit to score twenty three unanswered points, thanks in large part to the Jets turning the ball over an astonishing six times.

Super Bowl XXXIII: vs. Atlanta Falcons

The Denver Broncos become the third team in the last 9 years to repeat as Super Bowl champions, along with the San Francisco 49ers and the Dallas Cowboys. John Elway was voted Super Bowl MVP.

Statistics

Team stats 
The Broncos had 3,808 yards passing, sixth in the league.  They had 2,468 yards rushing, second in the league and 26 rushing touchdowns, first in the league. They had 6,276 total yards, third best.

They gave up 3,983 passing yards, a low 28 out of 30 in the NFL, but were third in rushing yards given up with 1,287. They gave up 5,270 yards, 12th in the NFL.  They scored 501 points, second in the league and gave up 309, eighth fewest in the league.

The Broncos’ 14–2 record remains their best regular season record (most wins and equal fewest losses) in franchise history.

Player stats 
For the season Elway threw for 2,806 yards, 22 touchdowns and ten interceptions. Davis rushed for 2,008 yards and 21 touchdowns. Rod Smith had 86 receptions for 1,222 yards and six touchdowns. Ed McCaffrey had 64 receptions for 1,053 yards. Shannon Sharpe had 64 receptions for 768 yards. Jason Elam kicked 23 out of 27 field goals and 58 out of 58 extra points including a 63-yard field goal to tie Tom Dempsey with the longest field goal in NFL history at that time. This record has since been eclipsed by another Denver Bronco in Matt Prater.

Steve Atwater, Davis, Elway, Tony Jones, Mark Schlereth, McCaffrey, Tom Nalen, Bill Romanowski, and Sharpe made the Pro Bowl.

Awards and records
 Terrell Davis, NFL MVP
 Terrell Davis, Franchise Record, Most Rushing Yards in One Season, 2,008 Yards
 Terrell Davis, Franchise Record, Most Touchdowns in One Season, 23 Touchdowns
John Elway, Super Bowl MVP
Jason Elam, tied longest field goal (63 yards)

Milestones
 Terrell Davis, 1st 2,000-yard rushing season, 2,008 Yards

References

External links
 1998 Denver Broncos at Pro-Football-Reference.com

Denver Broncos seasons
AFC West championship seasons
American Football Conference championship seasons
Super Bowl champion seasons
Denver Broncos
Bronco